Shandong Sports Lottery may refer to:

Shandong Sports Lottery, a government-sponsored sports lottery in Shandong, China
Shandong women's volleyball team, a women's volleyball team sponsored by Shandong Sports Lottery
Shandong Six Stars, a women's basketball team sponsored by Shandong Sports Lottery
Shandong Sports Lottery F.C., a women's football (soccer) team sponsored by Shandong Sports Lottery